Target is the debut studio album by American hip hop recording artist Gerald Walker. The album was released on September 22, 2015, by One Step at a Time Music & INgrooves. It is the first double album from Gerald Walker and the first album by Walker in collaboration with the eight-member vocal ensemble, The 7000. Target is also his first independent to digital retailer commercial album, whereas his previous releases were for promotional use only.

Background and promotion
On February 3, 2014, Gerald Walker announced The Target Practice Tour, a 16 date North American tour beginning on February 8, 2014, through the end of April 2014. The tour was accompanied by a mixtape release entitled, "Yesterday You Said Tomorrow (A Prelude to TARGET)". The release featured a collection of demos that did not make the final TARGET release.

In June 2015, Walker announced his book  Target: 52 Weeks to Completing My Album, a memoir about his life featuring stories and anecdotes simultaneously released with the album. On June 5, 2015, Walker released the first single from Target titled "No Heart Feelings" featuring The Family. On August 25, 2015, the second single from Target titled "Follow Through" was released. Upon its release, the album was supported by two additional concert tours. The first being the TARGET Listening Sessions, a 10 date, 8-city album listening event. During May 2016 Walker embarked a 15-date international tour supporting the album titled the TARGET World Tour.

Track listing

References

Gerald Walker albums
2015 albums
Albums produced by Cardo